Forero is a Spanish surname, meaning "someone obliged to pay tribute" or "tribute collector".

People with the name
 Efraín Forero Triviño (born 1931), Colombian cyclist
 Enrique Forero (born 1942), Colombian botanist
 Esther Forero (1919–2011), Colombian singer and composer
 Gabriel Forero Sanmiguel, Colombian journalist
 Gary Forero (born 1979), Colombian actor
 Juan Forero, Colombian-American journalist
 Juan Pablo Forero (born 1983), Colombian cyclist
 Laureano Forero Ochoa, Colombian architect
 Sophia Forero, American jewelry designer
 Teófilo Forero (fl. 1960–1989), Colombian politician and trade unionist

References

Spanish-language surnames